Paul Richard Butler (born 26 June 1963) is a former English cricketer.  Butler was a right-handed batsman who bowled right-arm medium pace.  He was born in Sleaford, Lincolnshire.

Butler made his debut for Lincolnshire in the 1983 Minor Counties Championship against Cumberland.  Butler played Minor counties cricket for Lincolnshire from 1983 to 1995, which included 51 Minor Counties Championship matches and 11 MCCA Knockout Trophy matches.  He made his List A debut against Surrey in the 1983 NatWest Trophy.  He scored 4 runs in the match, before being dismissed by Ian Payne.  He played a further List A match for Lincolnshire against Lancashire in the 1988 NatWest Trophy.  In this match, he took 3 wickets for the cost of 20 runs from 2.5 overs, while with the bat he scored 33 runs before being dismissed by Jack Simmons.

References

External links
Paul Butler at ESPNcricinfo
Paul Butler at CricketArchive

1963 births
Living people
People from Sleaford, Lincolnshire
English cricketers
Lincolnshire cricketers